I Am the Greatest: The Adventures of Muhammad Ali is an animated series featuring boxer Muhammad Ali, who performed his own voice. The series was broadcast Saturday mornings on NBC and produced by Fred Calvert's independent production company, Farmhouse Films, in the fall of 1977, but was cancelled after 13 episodes due to its low ratings.

In the show, Muhammad Ali went on adventures with his niece Nicky and nephew Damon.

Crew
 Directed by Fred Calvert
 Written by John Bates, Carole Beers, Booker Bradshaw, Ellen and David Christianson, Joseph R. Henderson, Bryan Joseph, Gene Moss

Episodes

Reception
The series received generally negative reviews. In The Encyclopedia of American Animated Television Shows, David Perlmutter writes, "Ali did attempt acting himself, starring in The Greatest and other film and TV projects, but he proved not to be as good at it as he was at throwing punches. That should have been a sign to the producers of this series that a project featuring him wasn't a good idea, but they ignored it, banking on Ali's popularity with children to make the series work. It did not. This was, instead, perhaps the most clumsily animated, written, and acted series in television animation history, with little of value presented."

See also
Mike Tyson Mysteries

References

External links

1970s American animated television series
1970s American black cartoons
Cultural depictions of Muhammad Ali
American children's animated adventure television series
NBC original programming
Boxing animation
1977 American television series debuts
1977 American television series endings
Television series by 20th Century Fox Television
Animation based on real people